The WAGR Msa class was a class of  Garratt-type articulated steam locomotives. The class was built at the Midland Railway Workshops and operated by the Western Australian Government Railways (WAGR) between 1930 and 1963. It was the first Garatt type to be designed and constructed entirely in Australia.

History
The class was preceded on the WAGR system by the M/Ms class Garratts. The class were used extensively on WAGR lines with light rails and sharp curves, as a consequence many of the smaller older branch lines on the Darling Scarp; as well as those with steep inclines such as those on the Mundaring Weir, Nannup, and Flinders Bay lines. In their later years, the boiler pressure was reduced to match that of the M/Ms class. By this stage they had been concentrated on the Bunbury to Boyup Brook and Pinjarra to Boddington lines.

Hearsay evidence suggests that the poor quality of the boilers in the Msa rendered some inoperable by the late 1940s. The last remaining Msa was awaiting moving to a preservation status in the adjacent to the Midland Railway Workshops, when instructions were misunderstood by a scrap metal company employee, and it was cut up.

Class list
The numbers and periods in service of each member of the Msa class were as follows:

See also

Rail transport in Western Australia
List of Western Australian locomotive classes

References

Notes

Bibliography

External links

Garratt locomotives
Railway locomotives introduced in 1930
Msa class
2-6-0+0-6-2 locomotives
3 ft 6 in gauge locomotives of Australia
Freight locomotives
Scrapped locomotives